Public Holidays in Fiji reflect the country's cultural diversity. Each major religion in Fiji has a public holiday dedicated to it. Also Fiji's major cities and towns hold annual carnivals, commonly called festivals, which are usually named for something relevant to the city or town, such as the Sugar Festival in Lautoka, as Lautoka's largest and most historically important industry is sugar production.

Public Holidays that fall on the weekend are usually moved to either the Friday of the preceding week or the Monday of the following week. This includes religious holidays as well, though in essence they are celebrated on the actual day.

List of important festivals and days in Fiji

Variable dates

2020
March 9-10 – Holi
March 20 – March equinox
April 2 – Rama Navami
April 5 – Palm Sunday / Children's Sunday
April 10-11 – Good Friday and Holy Saturday
April 12 – Easter
June 21 – June solstice
September 23 – September equinox
October 28 – The Prophet's Birthday
November 14 – Diwali
December 21 – December solstice
2021
March 28-29 – Holi
March 28 – Palm Sunday / Children's Sunday
April 2-3 – Good Friday and Holy Saturday
April 4 – Easter
October 11 – Fiji Day celebrated
October 18 – The Prophet's Birthday
November 4 – Diwali
2022
March 17-18 – Holi
April 2 – Palm Sunday / Children's Sunday
April 15-16 – Good Friday and Holy Saturday
April 17 – Easter
October 10
Fiji Day
The Prophet's Birthday
2023
January 2 – Day off for New Year
March 6-7 – Holi
March 21 – March equinox
April 7-8 – Good Friday and Holy Saturday
April 9 – Easter
June 22 – June Solstice
September 23 – September equinox
September 27 – The Prophet's Birthday
November 13 – Diwali
December 22 – December solstice
2024
March 22 – March equinox
March 24-25 – Holi
March 24 – Palm Sunday / Children's Sunday
March 29-30 – Good Friday and Holy Saturday 
March 31 – Easter
April 1 – Easter Monday
June 21 – June Solstice
September 16 – The Prophet's Birthday
September 23 – September equinox
December 21 – December solstice

References

 List
Festivals
Fiji
Fiji